Steve Morrison may refer to:

 Steve Morrison (radio personality) (born 1959), American radio DJ
 Steve Morrison (footballer) (born 1961), Scottish footballer
 Steve Morrison (American football) (born 1971), former Indianapolis Colt
 Steve Morrison (TV producer) (born 1947), Scottish TV producer and former Rector of the University of Edinburgh
 Stevie Morrison (born 1978), British yachtsman
 Steven Morrison, Scottish drummer, formerly with the View

See also
 George Stephen Morrison (1919–2008), American admiral, father of singer Jim Morrison
 Steve Morison (born 1983), Welsh international footballer